Mikko Salminen (born 30 April 1959) is a Finnish fencer. He competed in the individual and team épée events at the 1980 Summer Olympics.

References

1959 births
Living people
Finnish male épée fencers
Olympic fencers of Finland
Fencers at the 1980 Summer Olympics
Sportspeople from Helsinki